Cordova Bay Records is an independent record label in Victoria, British Columbia. The label operates in conjunction with Cordova Bay Music Publishing under the parent company Cordova Bay Entertainment Group. The company was founded by Michael Burke in 1999 and touts itself as an artist-oriented label.

History
Cordova Bay Entertainment Group was founded by Michael Burke, who grew up in the Toronto suburb of Don Mills during the 1960s.  It was there that he attended classes with the likes of writer and musician Paul Quarrington, renowned double bassists Roberto Occhipinti and Joel Quarrington, classical guitarist Norbert Kraft and pop singer Dan Hill.  Later, Burke performed the role of manager for many of his talented friends, setting up gigs and acquiring studio time.

Burke also happened to be a tech wiz.  In 1981, Burke quit his night job in the music business to spend the next two decades focusing on his career in computer technology, which turned out to be very lucrative.  By 1998, Burke had moved to Victoria, British Columbia was ready to return to the music business and continue the career he had put on hold seventeen years earlier.  By 1999, Cordova Bay Entertainment Group was up and running.

In its early years, Cordova Bay Records associated with Ragged Pup Records to put out albums by several artists on the Ragged Pup label, including David Gogo, Bill Bourne, Wyckham Porteous, and Doug Cox.  Later Cordova Bay Records acquired several Ragged Pup artists and released their albums on the Cordova Bay label.

Artists who had albums released by Cordova Bay Records between 1999 and 2005 include David Gogo, Wyckham Porteous, Bill Bourne, Tony Quarrington, Fan Tan Alley, Joe Hall, and Jeffery Sez.  For artists represented by Cordova Bay Records after 2005, see the section on Artists below.

Cordova Bay Entertainment Group also created a UK branch (Cordova Bay UK) that released albums in the United Kingdom, including Sam Roberts - Chemical City, Michael Kaeshammer - Tell You How I Feel and No Strings Attached, and The Puentes Brothers - Morumba Cubana.   Cordova Bay UK also invested in renowned UK label, Fierce Panda Records, who are credited with releases by bands including Coldplay, Art Brut, The Blackout, Keane, Death Cab for Cutie, The Polyphonic Spree, Placebo, and Shitdisco, among many others.

In 2006, Cordova Bay Entertainment Group and Fierce Panda Records launched a Canadian branch of Fierce Panda, known as Fierce Panda Canada.  Fierce Panda Canada released albums by UK artists iLiKETRAiNS, My Architects, Capdown, Make Good Your Escape, and Shitdisco. In 2016 Canadian band The Velveteins joined the Fierce Panda Canada roster, followed by Chersea in 2017, and The Tourist Company in 2019.

Gold and platinum certifications
State of Shock Too Pretty (Single) April 2010

State of Shock Best I Ever Had (Single) November 2008

State of Shock Money Honey (Single) May 2009

State of Shock Life, Love & Lies (Album) April 2011

Raghav Fire (Single) September 2011

Karl Wolf Amateur at Love (Single) April 2017

Awards and honors

Juno Awards
The Juno Awards are presented by the Canadian Academy of Recording Arts and Sciences. Cordova Bay Records artists have been nominated for a total of 5 Juno Awards since 2003.  Bill Bourne's album Sally's Dream was also nominated for an award in 1999 - it was released by Ragged Pup Records (later acquired by Cordova Bay Records).

|-
|  || Bill Bourne Sally's Dream || Best Roots & Traditional Album: Solo || 
|-
|  || David Gogo Live at Deer Lake || Blues Album of the Year || 
|-
|  || David Gogo Acoustic || Blues Album of the Year || 
|-
|rowspan="2"|  || State of Shock || New Group of the Year || 
|-
|| Bob Lanois Snake Road || Instrumental Album of the Year || 
|-
|  || Raghav So Much feat. Kardinal Offishall || R&B/Soul Recording of the Year || 
|-
|  || David Gogo Soul Bender || Blues Album of the Year || 
|-
|  || David Gogo Come On Down || Blues Album of the Year || 
|-
|  || David Gogo Vicksburg Call || Blues Album of the Year ||

Western Canadian Music Awards
The Western Canadian Music Awards is an annual awards ceremony for music in the western portion of Canada, that originated in its current form in 2003. The awards are provided by the Western Canada Music Alliance, which consists of five Member groups from Alberta, Saskatchewan, Manitoba, British Columbia and Yukon.

|-
| rowspan="2"| 2007 || David Gogo Acoustic || Outstanding Blues Recording || 
|-
|| Bill Bourne Boon Tang || Outstanding Roots Recording - Solo || 
|-
| rowspan="2"| 2008 || State of Shock Life, Love & Lies || Outstanding Rock Recording || 
|-
|| Wyckham Porteous 3 AM || Outstanding Roots Recording - Solo || 
|-
| 2012 || David Gogo Soul Bender || Blues Recording of the Year || 
|-
| 2014 || David Gogo Come On Down || Blues Recording of the Year || 
|-
| 2015 || WiL El Paseo || Roots Solo Recording of the Year || 
|-
| 2016 || David Gogo Vicksburg Call || Blues Artist of the Year || 
|-
| 2018 || Bend Sinister The Other Way || Recording of the Year || 
|-
| 2018 || Bend Sinister || Rock Artist of the Year ||

Canadian Indie Awards
The INDIE Music Awards happen every March in Toronto as part of Canadian Music Week.

|-
| 2008 || State of Shock Money Honey || Single of the Year || 
|-
| 2008 || David Gogo Acoustic || Blues Album of the Year || 
|-
| 2012 || David Gogo  || Blues Artist of the Year || 
|-
| 2012 || Raghav Fire || Single of the Year ||

Canadian Radio Music Awards
The Canadian Radio Music Awards are an annual series of awards presented by the Canadian Association of Broadcasters that are part of Canadian Music Week.

|-
| rowspan="2"| 2008 || State of Shock Money Honey || Best New Group (ROCK) || 
|-
|| State of Shock Money Honey || Best New Group (CHR) || 
|-
| 2011 || Raghav So Much || Dance/Urban/Rhythmic || 
|-
| rowspan="2"| 2012 || Raghav Fire || CHR || 
|-
|| Raghav Fire || HOT AC ||

Canadian Music and Broadcast Industry Awards
The Canadian Music and Broadcast Industry Awards happen every March in Toronto as part of Canadian Music Week.

|-
| 2009 || Cordova Bay Records || Canadian Independent Label of the Year ||

Maple Blues Awards
The Maple Blues Awards are Canada's blues awards, "honouring the finest in Canadian blues".  They are the only comprehensive national best in blues awards program.  The program's goal is to promote blues music across Canada, and to recognize outstanding achievement.  The Maple Blues Awards have been presented by the Toronto Blues Society since their inception in 1997.

|-
| 2002 || David Gogo || Guitarist of the Year || 
|-
| rowspan="5"| 2003 || David Gogo || Entertainer of the Year || 
|-
|| David Gogo || Electric Act of the Year || 
|-
|| David Gogo || Guitarist of the Year || 
|-
|| David Gogo || Songwriter of the Year || 
|-
|| David Gogo Skeleton Key || Recording of the Year || 
|-
| rowspan="2"| 2004 || David Gogo || Entertainer of the Year || 
|-
|| David Gogo || Guitarist of the Year || 
|-
| 2005 || David Gogo || Electric Act of the Year || 
|-
| 2009 || David Gogo || Electric Act of the Year || 
|-
| 2010 || David Gogo || Electric Act of the Year || 
|-
| rowspan="2"| 2011 || David Gogo || Guitar Player of the Year || 
|-
|| David Gogo || Electric Act of the Year || 
|-
| 2012 || David Gogo || Guitar Player of the Year || 
|-
| rowspan="2"| 2013 || David Gogo || Guitar Player of the Year || 
|-
|| David Gogo || Electric Act of the Year || 
|-
| 2014 || David Vest || Piano/Keyboard Player of the Year || 
|-
| rowspan="3"| 2015 || David Gogo || Guitarist of the Year || 
|-
|| David Gogo || Entertainer of the Year || 
|-
|| David Vest || Piano/Keyboard Player of the Year || 
|-
| rowspan="3"| 2016 || David Gogo || Electric Act of the Year || 
|-
|| David Gogo || Guitarist of the Year || 
|-
|| David Gogo Vicksburg Call || Recording/Producer of the Year || 
|-
| 2017 || David Gogo || Guitarist of the Year ||

Canadian Folk Music Awards
The Canadian Folk Music Awards are an annual music awards ceremony, presenting awards in a variety of categories for achievements in both traditional and contemporary folk music, and other roots music genres, by Canadian musicians. The awards program was created in 2005 by a group of independent label representatives, folk music presenters, artists and enthusiasts, to celebrate and promote Canadian folk music.

|-
| rowspan="3"| 2008 || Wyckham Porteous 3 AM || Contemporary Singer of the Year || 
|-
|| Wyckham Porteous 3 AM || English Songwriter of the Year || 
|-
|| Wyckham Porteous 3 AM || Solo Artist of the Year ||

West Coast Music Awards
The West Coast Music Awards were an annual music awards ceremony, presenting awards to musicians from British Columbia and the Yukon.  In 2003, the West Coast Music Awards combined with Alberta, Saskatchewan, and Manitoba to form the Western Canadian Music Awards.

|-
| 2000 || David Gogo || Musician of the Year || 
|-
| rowspan="3"| 2002 || Wyckham Porteous sexanddrinking || Best Indie Release || 
|-
|| Wyckham Porteous sexanddrinking || Best Folk Release || 
|-
|| Wyckham Porteous  || Musician of the Year ||

Artists
Current Roster:
 Karl Wolf
 Bend Sinister
 Rykka
 Tilsen
 David Gogo
 Sam Weber
 WiL

Historical Roster:
 Acres Of Lions
 Austin Belle
 Bill Bourne
 City Walls
 Mike Edel
 David Gogo
 Krome
 Bob Lanois
 Steph Macpherson
 Me and Mae
 Porkbelly Futures
 Wyckham Porteous
 Paul Quarrington
 Raghav (Canada Only)
 State Of Shock
 Isobel Trigger
 Vince Vaccaro
 David Vest
 Sam Weber

Affiliates
Cordova Bay Entertainment Group, Inc. consists of two main parts - Cordova Bay Records and Cordova Bay Music Publishing, and also includes Quarrington Worthy Music Publishing and Cordova Bay Music Publishing II.

The company also has equity involvement and partnerships with the following affiliates:

MapleCore Ltd.
 Maple Music Recordings
 Fontana North Distribution
 Open Road Recordings
 MapleMusic.com
 TicketBreak

Fierce Panda Records

Fierce Panda Canada

Flying Colours Label Services

The Mobile Cartel

Infinity Mastering Facility

References

External links
Official Cordova Bay Records website

Canadian independent record labels
Record labels established in 1999
Companies based in Victoria, British Columbia
Rock record labels
Indie rock record labels
Blues record labels
Folk record labels
Online music stores of Canada
1999 establishments in British Columbia